Wilhelm Albert may refer to:

Wilhelm Albert (engineer) (1787–1846), also Julius Albert, German mining administrator, engineer and inventor
Wilhelm Albert (SS officer) (1898–1960), German SS officer
Wilhelm Albert (Wehrmacht officer) (1917–2004), German Wehrmacht officer
Wilhelm Albert, Duke of Urach (born 1957), German Duke of Urach and engineer

See also
Albert (surname)